was a Japanese hurdler. He competed in the men's 110 metres hurdles at the 1952 Summer Olympics.

References

1920 births
2008 deaths
Sportspeople from Osaka Prefecture
Japanese male hurdlers
Olympic male hurdlers
Olympic athletes of Japan
Athletes (track and field) at the 1952 Summer Olympics
Asian Games silver medalists for Japan
Asian Games medalists in athletics (track and field)
Athletes (track and field) at the 1951 Asian Games
Medalists at the 1951 Asian Games
Japan Championships in Athletics winners
20th-century Japanese people
21st-century Japanese people